Tirtash (also Romanized as TīrTāsh) is a village in Kolbad-e Sharqi Rural District, Kolbad District, Galugah County, Mazandaran Province, Iran. At the 2006 census, its population was 2,586, in 676 families.

References 

Populated places in Galugah County